WMDT (channel 47) is a television station in Salisbury, Maryland, United States, affiliated with ABC and The CW Plus. It is the flagship television property of locally based Marquee Broadcasting, and has common ownership with low-power MeTV affiliate WGDV-LD (channel 32). Both stations share studios on West Main Street (mailing address is Downtown Plaza) in Salisbury, while WMDT's transmitter is located in Wicomico County northeast of Mardela Springs.

History
WMDT initiated broadcast operations in the Salisbury area on April 11, 1980. It was owned by the MDV Television Company. It was a primary ABC station with a secondary NBC affiliation. It was the brainchild of the late J. Paul Audet, a television pioneer who spent some of his early years in the Albuquerque, New Mexico and Charleston, South Carolina markets. With his late son, James R. Audet, equity and debt financing of approximately $3,500,000 was raised to construct and operate the station. In its early years of operation, WMDT won AP and UPI awards for its then innovative ENG efforts. Brechner Management Company, through its Delmarva Broadcast Service subsidiary, bought the station from MDV Television Company in 1982.  In 1992, the station became a sole ABC affiliate carrying that network's programming as well as a mix of syndicated shows; this left the Salisbury region without an NBC affiliate until 2014, when WRDE-LD affiliated with that network. For the 22 years that followed, cable and satellite systems in the region aired NBC programs via the network's stations in Baltimore (WMAR-TV until January 1995, then WBAL-TV), Philadelphia (KYW-TV until September 1995, then network-owned WCAU), Hagerstown (WHAG-TV, which is now an independent station), or Norfolk (WAVY-TV), depending on the location.

In 2000, WMDT launched cable-only WB affiliate "WBD" (the call letters were fictional). It was part of The WB 100+ as a result of the Salisbury market not being among the top 100 broadcast markets in the United States. The station was only available on Comcast and Mediacom channel 14 and, as a result, was known on-air as "WB 14". It replaced WPHL-TV's channel location on both systems. Several months after the launch, it was relocated to Comcast channel 3 and renamed "WB 3". On Mediacom systems, it moved to channel 2. WBD frequently aired cross-promotions for WMDT's main channel and its weeknight news programs.

In July 2003, WMDT's transmitter tower experienced a fire after a severe storm caused extensive damage to the transmitter. The analog UHF channel 47 signal was unavailable for many weeks although its digital signal, cable channel, and cable-only WB station were unaffected. In 2004, WMDT won the top "Service to Children" award for small market stations from the National Association of Broadcasters Education Foundation. The station also has "Teachers Who Make a Difference" and "Meet The Money Givers" programs among other community-service activities.

On January 24, 2006, the Warner Bros. Television division of Time Warner (which operated The WB in a joint venture with Tribune Broadcasting) and CBS Corporation (the then-new owners of UPN) announced that the two companies would shut down their respective networks and combine their resources to create a new network named The CW. UPN was offered on WBOC-TV's second digital subchannel and Comcast channel 5. It was announced on March 28 that WBD would become an affiliate of The CW via The CW Plus (a similar operation to The WB 100+). WMDT would then create a new second digital subchannel to simulcast WBD and offer CW programming for non-cable viewers. WBOC announced on May 9, 2006 that its UPN subchannel would become a Fox affiliate beginning August 21, 2006. On September 18, 2006, The CW debuted on WBD (now officially using the WMDT-DT2 calls). The station began to be known on-air as "Delmarva CW 3". During the annual Delaware State Fair, the 6 p.m. newscast is broadcast live from the Exhibit Hall.

Brechner Management Company announced the sale of WMDT to Marquee Broadcasting on August 8, 2013.

News operation

WMDT's news department, from its inception, used electronic news gathering instead of the commonly used 16 mm film which was still in use on the Delmarva Peninsula in 1980. It began broadcasting its first weekday noon show, known as Midday Live, on July 26, 1982. When WBD became WMDT-DT2, it began to simulcast the Midday broadcast. That channel also started to air a nightly prime time newscast which competes with WBOC-DT2. The 5 a.m. hour of WMDT's weekday morning show is simulcast on WMDT-DT2, followed by the nationally syndicated morning show The Daily Buzz.

Some well-known television personalities that started their careers at WMDT include Bonnie Bernstein (of ESPN), Mike Tobin, Gregg Jarrett of the Fox News Channel, and Greg Fishel now with WRAL-TV. WMDT has re-launched a sports department in April 2014. It airs a public affairs program, Good Things Delmarva, on Sunday mornings at 7. Unlike most ABC affiliates, it does not air local news weeknights at 5 p.m.

Following Marquee Broadcasting's acquisition of WMDT, there have been several changes. In 2013, the station launched a sports department. In 2015, the station became the first in the nation to regularly broadcast its newscasts from a virtual news studio. Additionally, a focus was put on investigative reporting.

In September 2015, WMDT launched the 47ABC News Hour, airing each weeknight from 5:30 to 6:30 p.m. The station branded this newscast as "local news done differently."

Notable former on-air staff
 Greg Fishel, later with WRAL-TV
 Gregg Jarrett, now with Fox News Channel
 Mike Seidel, now with The Weather Channel
 Bonnie Bernstein, later with ESPN

Technical information

Subchannels
The station's digital signal is multiplexed:

On May 21, 2014, Weigel Broadcasting announced that WMDT had signed an affiliation agreement to carry MeTV programming on a new digital subchannel; the network debuted on digital channel 47.3 on May 26.

Analog-to-digital conversion
WMDT discontinued regular programming on its analog signal, over UHF channel 47, in September 2008. The station's digital signal relocated from its pre-transition UHF channel 53, which was among the high band UHF channels (52-69) that were removed from broadcasting use as a result of the transition, to its analog-era UHF channel 47.

Former translator
WMDT previously operated low-power digital repeater WEVD-LD (VHF channel 3, also mapped to virtual channel 47), licensed to Dover, Delaware, but primarily serving Wilmington. Both Wilmington and Dover are part of the Philadelphia television market, which is served by ABC owned-and-operated station WPVI-TV (channel 6). This station was sold in 2020 and moved to the Harrisburg, Pennsylvania area as WRZH-LP.

Satellite availability
WMDT is available on DirecTV and Dish Network in the Delmarva counties of Wicomico, Somerset, Worcester, and Dorchester in Maryland and Sussex County in Delaware.

See also
Channel 29 digital TV stations in the United States
Channel 47 virtual TV stations in the United States

References

External links

WMDT-DT2 "Delmarva CW 3"

ABC network affiliates
MeTV affiliates
Ion Television affiliates
Marquee Broadcasting
MDT
MDT
Television channels and stations established in 1980
1980 establishments in Maryland